is a Japanese former footballer.

Coaching career
Since retiring, Akasaka has served as an academy coach at Tokyo Verdy.

Career statistics

Club

Notes

References

1991 births
Living people
Association football people from Tokyo
Ryutsu Keizai University alumni
Japanese footballers
Japanese expatriate footballers
Association football midfielders
Singapore Premier League players
Japan Soccer College players
Albirex Niigata Singapore FC players
Japanese expatriate sportspeople in Singapore
Expatriate footballers in Singapore